Tobi 3 - Coptic Calendar - Tobi 5

The fourth day of the Coptic month of Tobi, the fifth month of the Coptic year. On a common year, this day corresponds to December 30, of the Julian Calendar, and January 12, of the Gregorian Calendar. This day falls in the Coptic season of Peret, the season of emergence.

Commemorations

Saints 

 The departure of Saint John the Evangelist, one of the Twelve Apostles

References 

Days of the Coptic calendar